Andraž Jereb (born 8 April 1992) is a Slovenian judoka.

He is the gold medallist of the 2016 Judo Grand Prix Zagreb in the -66 kg category.

References

External links
 

1992 births
Living people
Slovenian male judoka
Mediterranean Games silver medalists for Slovenia
Mediterranean Games bronze medalists for Slovenia
Mediterranean Games medalists in judo
Competitors at the 2013 Mediterranean Games
Competitors at the 2018 Mediterranean Games
European Games competitors for Slovenia
Judoka at the 2015 European Games
Judoka at the 2019 European Games
21st-century Slovenian people